Cyanogen chloride is a highly toxic chemical compound with the formula CNCl. This linear, triatomic pseudohalogen is an easily condensed colorless gas. More commonly encountered in the laboratory is the related compound cyanogen bromide, a room-temperature solid that is widely used in biochemical analysis and preparation.

Synthesis, basic properties, structure
Cyanogen chloride is a molecule with the connectivity .  Carbon and chlorine are linked by a single bond, and carbon and nitrogen by a triple bond.  It is a linear molecule, as are the related cyanogen halides (NCF, NCBr, NCI).  Cyanogen chloride is produced by the oxidation of sodium cyanide with chlorine.  This reaction proceeds via the intermediate cyanogen.
NaCN + Cl2 -> ClCN + NaCl
The compound trimerizes in the presence of acid to the heterocycle called cyanuric chloride.

Cyanogen chloride is slowly hydrolyzed by water at neutral pH to release cyanate and chloride ions:
ClCN + H2O -> NCO- + Cl- + 2H+

Applications in synthesis
Cyanogen chloride is a precursor to the sulfonyl cyanides and chlorosulfonyl isocyanate, a useful reagent in organic synthesis.

Safety
Also known as CK, cyanogen chloride is a highly toxic blood agent, and was once proposed for use in chemical warfare. It causes immediate injury upon contact with the eyes or respiratory organs. Symptoms of exposure may include drowsiness, rhinorrhea (runny nose), sore throat, coughing, confusion, nausea, vomiting, edema, loss of consciousness, convulsions, paralysis, and death. It is especially dangerous because it is capable of penetrating the filters in gas masks, according to United States analysts. CK is unstable due to polymerization, sometimes with explosive violence.

Chemical weapon
Cyanogen chloride is listed in schedule 3 of the Chemical Weapons Convention: all production must be reported to the OPCW.

By 1945, the U.S. Army's Chemical Warfare Service developed chemical warfare rockets intended for the new M9 and M9A1 Bazookas. An M26 Gas Rocket was adapted to fire cyanogen chloride-filled warheads for these rocket launchers. As it was capable of penetrating the protective filter barriers in some gas masks, it was seen as an effective agent against Japanese forces (particularly those hiding in caves or bunkers) because their standard issue gas masks lacked the barriers that would provide protection against cyanogen chloride.  The US added the weapon to its arsenal, and considered using it, along with hydrogen cyanide, as part of Operation Downfall, the planned invasion of Japan, but President Harry Truman decided against it, instead using the atomic bombs developed by the secret Manhattan Project. The CK rocket was never deployed or issued to combat personnel.

References

External links
 
 
 

Chlorine compounds
Triatomic molecules
Cyano compounds
Nonmetal halides
Blood agents
Pseudohalogens